Traitors Gate 2: Cypher is a 2003 graphic adventure game developed by Swedish studios 258 Productions AB and Data Ductus AB and published by The Adventure Company. It is the sequel to Daydream Software's game Traitors Gate.

Gameplay

Plot

Development
Traitors Gate 2 was commissioned by The Adventure Company following its success with the North America release of Daydream Software's Traitors Gate, which sold roughly 250,000 units in the region by August 2003. Daydream told its investors that a deal with "an internationally recognized publisher" to develop the sequel was reached in April 2002, and that it was funded ahead of time by this outside party. The project was scheduled for a 14-month development cycle. Traitors Gate 2 was ultimately developed by the company 258 Productions. Nigel Papworth, who conceived and designed the game at 258, recalled, "I didn't really want to go back and do a pre-rendered game. It's an awful lot of administration and the actual workload is huge. But I said [to TAC]: 'I'll do it if you'll let me do it in real-time 3D.' " He felt that graphics technology had advanced enough to make this leap, and that the switch offered him "a huge amount of freedom for the gameplay." As a result, the team licensed the Gamebryo engine to create Traitors Gate 2. By June 2002, the game was set for a September 2003 release.

Papworth based Traitors Gate 2 on ancient Babylon, inspired by his "reading an article on cryptography technique at the same time as a book on Babylonian history." He proceeded to combine the two to create the game concept. It was first announced as Cypher: The Sequel to Traitors Gate in April 2003, following a teaser in July 2002 under the working title Traitors Gate II.

Reception

Traitors Gate 2 received "generally negative reviews", according to review aggregation website Metacritic. Cindy Yans of Computer Games Magazine wrote that there was "nothing really redeeming" about the game. Jim Saighman of Adventure Gamers summarized it as "[p]ossibly the worst adventure game of 2003, guaranteed to piss off both adventurers and twitchers."

References

External links

2003 video games
Adventure games
Point-and-click adventure games
Puzzle video games
Single-player video games
Spy video games
The Adventure Company games
Video games developed in Sweden
Windows games
Windows-only games